The 1907–08 Michigan State Normal Normalites men's basketball team finished with a record of 3–5. It was the fifth year for head coach Wilbur P. Bowen. The team captain was Roland Chapman. The team manager was Leroy Stevens. The team closed "its season by defeating Mt. Pleasant and thereby winning the Normal championship of the state."

Roster

Schedule

|-
!colspan=9 style="background:#006633; color:#FFFFFF;"| Non-conference regular season

1. EMU Media guide shows 37-21 and yearbook shows 38–21.

2. EMU has the date of March 6, while CMU has March 7 has the date of the game.

Sources:

References

External links
https://emueagles.com/sports/2018/11/7/2018-19-mens-basketball-media-guide.aspx?id=943

Eastern Michigan Eagles men's basketball seasons
Michigan State Normal Normalites